William Edward Dole Sr. (July 5, 1909 – February 7, 1966) was an American football coach.  He served as the head football coach at East Carolina University from 1949 to 1951 and Davidson College from 1952 to 1964, compiling a career college football coaching record of 58–80–5.

Life
Dole was born July 5, 1909 in Galesburg, Michigan, the son of Clinton Howard Dole and his wife, Alma Lovica (Eaton) Dole. His parents had married on September 11, 1906, and divorced on February 16, 1918.

His father would re-marry, divorce again, re-marry again, and divorce again. From his father’s third marriage, Dole has a step-sister, Kay Dole McConnell Warnicke (1932-2007).

Through his father, he is a descendant of Louis DuBois, Louis Bevier, Simon LeFevre, Andries LeFevre, and Christian Deyo, all patentees, or founders, of New Paltz, New York. He also descends from the DeWitt family, making him a distant cousin of former New York State Governor DeWitt Clinton.

He married Helen Elizabeth Williams (1912-1964), a native of Beckley, West Virginia, on August 18, 1934 in Manhattan, New York. They had one son, William Edward Dole Jr. (1942-2011).

Dole died in his car at the age of 56, near his apartment in Newton, North Carolina, due to a heart attack on February 7, 1966.

Head coaching record

College

References

1909 births
1966 deaths
Davidson Wildcats football coaches
East Carolina Pirates football coaches
High school football coaches in North Carolina
High school football coaches in West Virginia
New York University alumni
West Virginia University alumni
Sportspeople from Kalamazoo, Michigan